Anaerophaga is a Gram-positive and strictly anaerobic genus of bacteria from the family of Marinilabiliaceae with one known species (Anaerophaga thermohalophila). Anaerophaga thermohalophila has been isolated from anoxic sludge from Hannover in Germany.

References

Bacteria genera
Bacteroidia
Monotypic bacteria genera